Dilma Deh (also Romanized as Dīlmā Deh; also known as Delamdeh) is a village in Blukat Rural District, Rahmatabad and Blukat District, Rudbar County, Gilan Province, Iran. At the 2006 census, its population was 102, in 23 families.

References 

Populated places in Rudbar County